Maurice Sullivan may refer to:

 Maurice J. Sullivan (1884–1953), American politician in Nevada
 Maurice J. "Sully" Sullivan (1909–1998), Irish-born businessman in Hawaii
 Maurice S. Sullivan  (1893-1935) Biographer of Jedediah Smith